Charles Ray Mabee (February 16, 1901 - October 14, 1965) was an American Republican politician, lawyer, and U.S. Army veteran who has served in the Missouri General Assembly in the Missouri Senate being first elected to the senate in 1934.  Commonly known as Ray Mabee, he had served as the Prosecuting Attorney of Putnam County, Missouri, and as city attorney for Unionville, Missouri.  Mabee was also the Republican Party nominee for Missouri Attorney General in 1940.

Born in Appanoose County, Iowa, he was educated at rural schools in Iowa, public schools in Unionville, Northeast Missouri State Teachers College, the University of Colorado, and the University of Missouri.  In the U.S. Army, he served in the Judge-Advocate General's Department, reaching the rank of major.

References

External links
 Charles Ray Mabee, Find a Grave
 The Political Graveyard: A Database of American History Index to Politicians, Ma to Macdevitt

1901 births
1965 deaths
20th-century American politicians
Republican Party Missouri state senators